Zachary Jones Baylin is an American screenwriter, known as the writer of King Richard and co-writer of Creed III and Gran Turismo.

Life and career
Baylin is a native of Wilmington, Delaware. He attended the Tatnall School and graduated from Johns Hopkins University in 2002, where he was a two-time Academic All-America receiver on the football team.

After graduating, Baylin moved to New York City, where he worked as a production assistant and set dresser for films and television including Dave Chappelle's Block Party, Jack Goes Boating, Top Five, Boardwalk Empire, and Gossip Girl.

He wrote the screenplay to King Richard, which was listed on the 2018 blacklist of best unproduced screenplay. The film earned him a nomination for the Academy Award for Best Original Screenplay.

Baylin co-wrote Creed III with Keenan Coogler, set for a wide release on March 3, 2023. In April 2022, he was announced as the writer of a new film based on The Crow, starring Bill Skarsgård.

Baylin is married to Katherine Temma Susman, with whom he has two children.

Filmography
 King Richard (2021)
 Creed III (2023)
 Gran Turismo (2023)
 The Crow (TBA)

References

External links

Living people
21st-century American male writers
21st-century American screenwriters
American male screenwriters
Screenwriters from Delaware
Johns Hopkins University alumni
Year of birth missing (living people)